The Time to Die is a 1970 French crime film directed by André Farwagi and starring Anna Karina. It was entered into the 20th Berlin International Film Festival.

Cast
 Anna Karina as Young Girl
 Bruno Cremer as Max Topfer
 Jean Rochefort as Hervé Breton
 Billy Kearns as Helmut
 Daniel Moosmann as Marco
 Michel Beaune
 Jacques Debary
 Lara Koski
 Gaëtan Noël
 Georges Ser
 Yanti
 Catherine Rich as Isabelle Breton

References

External links

1970 films
1970s French-language films
1970 crime films
French crime films
1970s French films